Swan Lake 29 is a First Nations reserve in Kenora District, Ontario. It is one of the reserves of the Wabaseemoong Independent Nations.

References

External links
 Canada Lands Survey System

Ojibwe reserves in Ontario
Communities in Kenora District